Sociala is an extinct genus of cockroach which existed in what is now France during the early Cretaceous period (Albian age). It was named by Peter Vršanský in 2010, and the type species is Sociala perlucida.

Phylogeny 
Cladogram after Vršanský (2010).

References

Cockroach genera
Fossil taxa described in 2010
Prehistoric insect genera